Several ships have shared the name SS Ausonia:

 , sunk by a torpedo attack in 1917
 , formerly SS Tortona, owned by the Cunard Line from 1911 to 1918
  — see German aircraft carrier I
  — see

See also 
 Ausonia (disambiguation)

Ship names